Travel In Taiwan, an English-language bimonthly magazine, is produced in Taipei, Taiwan by Vision International Publishing Co., Ltd. on behalf of Taiwan's Tourism Bureau, an agency of the country's Ministry of Transportation and Communications. The magazine, which is designed to encourage foreign tourists to visit Taiwan, includes information on many aspects of traveling on the Pacific island.

Recent issues have been about 60 pages long, each with around 10 feature articles, a culture & art segment, a calendar of upcoming events, travel news, and a small amount of advertising, including a listing of select hotels. Articles are often accompanied by small maps, helpful info on accommodation, restaurants, and public transport, as well as a list of terms and place names in English and Chinese.

External links
 Travel In Taiwan online at zinio 
 Travel In Taiwan magazine and website 
 Travel In Taiwan, parks and activities, cities, attractions, services, travel and activities.
 Tourism Bureau M.O.T.C, Republic of China Taiwan (Official Government Website)

Bi-monthly magazines
Mass media in Taipei
Magazines published in Taiwan
Tourism magazines
Magazines with year of establishment missing
English-language magazines